Prince of the Ville is the debut album by rapper All Star Cashville Prince, it was released through the independent label, Loyalty Records & Inevitable Records. Guest appearances include Young Paper and Yo Gotti.

Track list

References

2005 debut albums